This is a list of public art in Tippecanoe County, Indiana.

This list applies only to works of public art accessible in an outdoor public space. For example, this does not include artwork visible inside a museum.

Most of the works mentioned are sculptures. When this is not the case (i.e. sound installation, for example) it is stated next to the title.

Battle Ground

Cairo

Lafayette

West Lafayette

References

Tourist attractions in Tippecanoe County, Indiana
Tippecanoe County